Joanna Woodall (born 1956) is an art historian at the Courtauld Institute of Art, London, where she is a specialist in portraiture and Netherlandish art.

Education
Woodall has a BA degree in history from the University of York and an MA and PhD from the Courtauld Institute.

Career
Woodall was a Speelman Fellow in Dutch and Flemish Art at Wolfson College, Cambridge, from 1980 to 1982, and an assistant curator at Christ Church Picture Gallery, Oxford, from 1982 to 1985. She spent a year on a Leverhulme Fellowship at the University of Leiden.

She has been at the Courtauld Institute of Art since 1986 where she specialises in portraiture and Netherlandish art. Woodall is also a member of the editorial board of the Nederlands Kunsthistorisch Jaarboek (Netherlands Yearbook for History of Art).

Protests
In 2010, Woodall was with a group of Courtauld students protesting about increased university tuition fees when they reportedly received rough treatment from the Metropolitan Police with Woodall herself being picked up by an officer and thrown into a group of protestors.

Selected publications
Portraiture: Facing the Subject. Manchester University Press, Manchester, 1997. (Editor) 
"Wtewael's Perseus and Andromeda: looking for love in seventeenth century Dutch painting" in C. Arscott and K. Scott eds., Manifestations of Venus. Art and Sexuality, Manchester University Press, Manchester, 2000.
Self Portrait. Renaissance to Contemporary. National Portrait Gallery, London and Art Gallery of New South Wales, Sydney, 2005. (With Anthony Bond, Timothy J. Clark, Ludmilla J. Jordanova and Joseph Leo Koerner) 
Anthonis Mor. Art and Authority. Studies in Netherlandish Art and Cultural History Volume 8. Waanders Press, Zwolle, 2007. (With Tony Bond) 
"A Woman's Place. Joanna Woodall 1982-1985", in Jacqueline Thalmann (ed.), 40 Years of Christ Church Picture Gallery. Still one of Oxford’s best kept secrets. 2008. 
Nederlands Kunsthistorisch Jaarboek 59 (2009): Envisioning the Artist in the Early Modern Netherlands. Edited with H. Perry Chapman. 2010.

See also
Women in the art history field

References

External links
Dem dry Bones. Portrayal in print after the death of the Original Model: An essay by Joanna Woodall.
Joanna Woodall lecturing on Trading Identities, the image of the merchant at Gresham College.
http://courtauld.academia.edu/JoannaWoodall

Living people
Academics of the Courtauld Institute of Art
Alumni of the University of York
Alumni of the Courtauld Institute of Art
Women art historians
British art historians
British women historians
1956 births